The following games were initially announced as Nintendo DS titles, however were subsequently cancelled or postponed indefinitely by developers or publishers.

References

 
Nintendo DS games
Nintendo DS